The PFL 9 mixed martial arts event for the 2022 season of the Professional Fighters League was held on August 20, 2022, at the Copper Box Arena in London, England. This was the start of the playoffs for the Women's Lightweight and Featherweight divisions.

Background 
This event will mark the third and final PFL playoff card, with the Women's Lightweight and Featherweight playoffs holding their semifinal bouts with the semi-finals having UFC vet Chris Wade facing Brendan Loughnane, while Ryoji Kudo facing Bubba Jenkins.

The Women's Lightweight bracket sees UFC vet Larissa Pacheco take on Olena Kolesnyk while Kayla Harrison faces Martina Jindrová in the other lightweight semifinal.

Results

2022 PFL Women's Lightweight playoffs

2022 PFL Featherweight playoffs

See also 

 List of PFL events
 List of current PFL fighters

References 

Events in London
Professional Fighters League
2022 in mixed martial arts
August 2022 sports events in the United Kingdom
PFL